James Cox (July 28, 1882 –  March 3, 1925) was an American vaudeville performer, and songwriter famous for his Roaring Twenties hit, "Nobody Knows You When You're Down and Out", written in 1923.

Jimmy Cox's daughter, Gertrude "Baby" Cox, sang with Duke Ellington's orchestra in 1928.

References

External links

1882 births
1925 deaths
Songwriters from Virginia
Musicians from Richmond, Virginia